The Rheinberg War Cemetery is a Commonwealth War Graves Commission cemetery in Rheinberg, Germany. It was established in 1946 and is home to 3,330 graves from the Second World War.

History 
The site for the Rheinberg War Cemetery was selected in April 1946. Commonwealth servicemen from other cemeteries in the region were moved to the new cemetery. Most of the servicemen buried served in the air force during the bombing of Germany. Servicemen from other services mostly fought during the Western Allied invasion of Germany.

Cemetery 
The cemetery was designed by Philip Hepworth following standard Commission architectural design features, and contains 3,330 graves, out of which 3,183 have been identified. Every grave is marked with a white headstone and the cemetery grounds are grass covered with a floral border around the headstones. The cemetery is surrounded on three sides by forest and borders a road in the south. The south side is walled by a hedge with a low wall and a wrought-iron gate entrance in the middle. The graves are located on the east and west side of the cemetery with the middle containing several structures such as a Stone of Remembrance and a Cross of Sacrifice.

Gallery of images

References

External links

 

British military memorials and cemeteries
Canadian military memorials and cemeteries
Commonwealth War Graves Commission cemeteries in Germany
Buildings and structures in Wesel (district)